Reed Doughty (born November 4, 1982) is a former American football safety who played in the National Football League. He was drafted by the Washington Redskins in the sixth round, with the 173rd overall pick, of the 2006 NFL Draft. He played college football at the University of Northern Colorado.

Doughty is best known for taking over the starting job at free safety following the injury and subsequent death of Sean Taylor, as well as for his public work to support organ donation, particularly for Americans with kidney disease.

College career
During his college career, Doughty was a member of many Academic All-American teams, having graduated with a perfect 4.0 GPA in sport and exercise science.  Doughty  was also a finalist for the Draddy Trophy award (also known as the "Academic Heisman") following his senior year.

Professional career

Washington Redskins

Doughty was drafted by the Washington Redskins in the sixth round of the 2006 NFL Draft. In 2007, Doughty switched his jersey number to 37 from 23, which he wore in his rookie season. He had his first career start in Week 11 of the 2007 season against the Dallas Cowboys. In the 2010 season, he recorded a career high of 93 tackles as well as one sack, two pass deflections, and one forced fumble.

In 2011, Doughty was re-signed by the Redskins to a three-year contract. Throughout the 2011 season, he played as the backup to both free safety, Oshiomogho Atogwe, and strong safety, LaRon Landry, splitting the responsibility with DeJon Gomes. Before the start of the 2013 season, Doughty was elected by his teammates to be the Redskins' special teams captain.

Personal
Doughty has severe hearing impairment and sometimes has to read lips to understand what others are saying.

In 2002, Doughty married his girlfriend Katie. They met several years earlier at 3J's Christian Coffeehouse in Johnstown, Colorado, his hometown while they were both in high school.  The Doughtys had a baby in August 2006, a son named Micah. Micah was born prematurely and suffered kidney failure as a baby, but received a successful kidney transplant and is now doing well. The Doughtys also had a daughter, and are currently living in Northern Colorado.

Doughty is a Christian.

References

External links
Washington Redskins bio
UNC Bears bio

1982 births
Living people
People from Greeley, Colorado
American football safeties
Northern Colorado Bears football players
Washington Redskins players
Ed Block Courage Award recipients